is a railway station in the city of Motosu, Gifu Prefecture, Japan, operated by the private railway operator Tarumi Railway.

Lines

Station layout
Kochibora Station has one ground-level side platform serving a single bi-directional track. The station is unattended.

Adjacent stations

|-
!colspan=5|Tarumi Railway

History
Kochibora Station opened on January 15, 1958.

Surrounding area

Neo River

See also
 List of Railway Stations in Japan

References

External links

 

Railway stations in Gifu Prefecture
Railway stations in Japan opened in 1958
Stations of Tarumi Railway
Motosu, Gifu